The Esplen Baronetcy, of Hardres Court in Canterbury in the County of Kent, is a title in the Baronetage of the United Kingdom. It was created on 14 July 1921 for Sir John Esplen, KBE,. He was a Senior Director of Esplen, Sons and Swainston, consulting engineers and naval architects, and served as Chief Technical Adviser to the Ministry of Shipping during the First World War.

Esplen baronets, of Hardres Court (1921)
Sir John Esplen, 1st Baronet (1863–1930)
Sir William Graham Esplen, 2nd Baronet (1899–1989)
Sir John Graham Esplen, 3rd Baronet (1932–2016)
Sir William John Harry Esplen, 4th Baronet (born 1967)
The heir apparent is Frederick William Harry Esplen (born 2001), only son of the 4th Baronet

Arms

Notes

References
Kidd, Charles, Williamson, David (editors). Debrett's Peerage and Baronetage (1990 edition). New York: St Martin's Press, 1990, 

Esplen